Hendrik "Dick" Pappenheim (23 June 1929 – 12 August 2016) was a Dutch alpine skier. He competed in three events at the 1952 Winter Olympics.

Olympic results

References

1929 births
2016 deaths
Dutch male alpine skiers
Olympic alpine skiers of the Netherlands
Alpine skiers at the 1952 Winter Olympics
Sportspeople from Amsterdam
20th-century Dutch people